Bustang is an intercity bus service in the U.S. state of Colorado. Service began in 2015 and originally traveled between Denver and Colorado Springs, Fort Collins, and Glenwood Springs. Service has since been expanded to connect Grand Junction, Durango, Gunnison, Alamosa, Pueblo, Fairplay and Lamar among others. It is Colorado's first state-run bus service.

History 

Bustang service began on July 13, 2015. Service was originally provided along three lines: the West Line from Denver to Glenwood Springs along I-70, the North Line from Denver to Fort Collins along I-25, and the South Line from Denver to Colorado Springs also along I-25. The Colorado Department of Transportation estimated that there would be 87,376 passengers during the Bustang's first year of operation, however, ridership surpassed 100,000. At first the buses ran only on weekdays, but weekend service was quickly added along the West  Line to accommodate skiers and along the North Line through the "RamsRoute" program. RamsRoute was intended for students and only ran one round-trip bus per weekend. Regular weekend service to both Fort Collins and Colorado Springs was added in 2017. First year revenue totaled over $1,000,000, which was enough to cover 38% of Bustang's costs.

In 2017, communities across Colorado began to lobby for expanded Bustang service. This came after the second year ridership for the Bustang reached 156,000. In early 2018, service was added between Lamar and Pueblo along US 50. The new program was dubbed "Outrider" and focuses on rural Colorado. The Outrider program was expanded in May by adding a line between Pueblo and Alamosa. Later that summer the West Line was extended to Grand Junction, with hopes that the route would hit 15,000 annual passengers. Two additional Outrider services began roughly at the same time. The first was between Durango and Grand Junction, and the second was between Denver and Gunnison. In December 2018, an additional route between Colorado Springs and the Denver Tech Center was started. Total ridership from July 2017 to June 2018 reached 194,064.

In 2019, there was pressure to further expand capacity, but was unable to solve a shortage of drivers. The difficulty in finding new drivers has been attributed to low wages and to federally mandated drug tests. Ridership of the North, South, and West lines reached 238,252 for the 2018–2019 time period. A new bus line dubbed "Snowstang" was announced in December 2019. It will ferry passengers from Denver to Arapahoe Basin, Loveland Ski Area and Steamboat Springs.

In 2021, a new route began service between Craig and Denver with stops at Steamboat Springs, Granby, Winter Park, and Idaho Springs and various in between.

Services

Primary services 
Bustang operates six regular routes. The North, South, West and Pegasus routes operate seven days per week, the Denver Tech Center Route operates five days per week, and the Estes Park route operates on weekends.
Pegasus Route: Denver to Avon
Denver to Estes Park
North Route: Fort Collins to Denver
West Route: Grand Junction to Denver
South Route: Colorado Springs to Denver
Colorado Springs to Denver Technological Center

Outrider services 
There are seven routes that are part of the Bustang Outrider service, which are operated by companies other than CDOT.
Lamar to Colorado Springs
Alamosa to Pueblo
Durango to Grand Junction
Gunnison to Denver
Crested Butte to Denver
Craig to Denver
Telluride to Grand Junction

Special services 
Snowstang is a service operated by Bustang during the ski season. It sends buses to ski resorts such as the Loveland Ski Arena, Arapahoe Basin and Steamboat Springs.

RamsRoute operates between Denver and Colorado State University in Fort Collins and operates during the school year.

Bustang to Broncos offers service from Colorado Springs and Fort Collins to Empower Field at Mile High during Denver Broncos football games.

See also 
Front Range Express (FREX)

References

External links 
Official website
Bustang webpage on CODOT.gov

Transportation companies of the United States
Intercity bus companies of the United States
Transportation companies based in Colorado